Out of the Storm is a 1948 American crime film directed by R. G. Springsteen and written by John K. Butler. The film stars Jimmy Lydon, Lois Collier, Marc Lawrence, Richard Travis, Robert Emmett Keane and Helen Wallace. The film was released on September 11, 1948 by Republic Pictures.

Plot

Cast    
Jimmy Lydon as Donald Lewis
Lois Collier as Ginny Powell
Marc Lawrence as Red Stubbins
Richard Travis as R.J. Ramsey
Robert Emmett Keane as Holbrook
Helen Wallace as Martha Lewis
Harry Hayden as Chief Ryan
Roy Barcroft as Arty Sorenson
Charles Lane as Mr. Evans
Iris Adrian as Ginger
Byron Foulger as Al Weinstock
Claire Du Brey as Mrs. Smith
Smoki Whitfield as Maintenance Man
Charles Sullivan as Plant Guard
Rex Lease as Gus Clute
Edgar Dearing as Ed Purcell

References

External links 
 

1948 films
American crime films
1948 crime films
Republic Pictures films
Films directed by R. G. Springsteen
American black-and-white films
1940s English-language films
1940s American films